Alfred Ernest Watkins (26 June 1878 – 7 December 1957), also known as Fred Watkins, was a Welsh international footballer who played as an inside-forward or winger.

Watkins played club football for Leicester Fosse, Aston Villa, Grimsby Town and Millwall Athletic. He was part of the Wales national football team between 1898 and 1904, playing 5 matches. He played his first match on 19 March 1898 against Scotland and his last match on 21  March 1904 against Ireland.

His younger brother, Walter Watkins, also played professional football.

See also
 List of Wales international footballers (alphabetical)

References

1878 births
1957 deaths
People from Montgomeryshire
Sportspeople from Powys
Welsh footballers
Wales international footballers
Association football inside forwards
Leicester City F.C. players
Aston Villa F.C. players
Grimsby Town F.C. players
Millwall F.C. players
Association football wingers
Caersws F.C. players
Oswestry Town F.C. players
Southend United F.C. players
English Football League players